Steve Yegge is an American computer programmer and blogger who is known for writing about programming languages, productivity and software culture through his "Stevey's Drunken Blog Rants" site, followed by "Stevey's Blog Rants."

Education 
Yegge began high school at 11 and graduated when he was 14. During his youth, Yegge played guitar in garage bands. After turning 18, Yegge joined the United States Navy and attended Nuclear Power School to become a nuclear reactor operator. Yegge received a bachelor's degree in computer science from the University of Washington.

Career 
Yegge began his career as a computer programmer at GeoWorks in 1992. From 1998 to 2005, he worked as a Senior Manager of Software Development at Amazon. From 2005 to 2018, Yegge worked as a Senior Staff Software Engineer at Google in Kirkland, Washington. In 2018, Yegge left Google to join Grab, a ridesharing company based in Singapore with an American hub in Seattle. After leaving Google, Yegge was interviewed by CNBC about why he left the company. Yegge stated that the company had grown "too conservative" and was "no longer innovative."

In May 2020, Yegge announced that he would be leaving Grab to focus on the development of Wyvern, a video game he has been working on independently since 1995.

In October 2022, Yegge joined Sourcegraph as Head of Engineering.

Blog 
Yegge's blog has received considerable attention, particularly his series of posts on hiring and interviewing.

In addition to his posts on hiring and interviewing, Yegge's "Lisp is Not an Acceptable Lisp" post about the Lisp programming language has been widely discussed and cited.

Other programmers—including Paul Bissex, the co-author of Python Web Development with Django—have described Yegge's blog as "required reading".

Upon leaving Google for Grab, Yegge published a 5000-word post in which he critiqued what he claimed is Google's lack of innovation.

Yegge accidentally made an internal Google memo public on Google+ in October 2011. His 3,700-word comment garnered major media and blogger attention for Yegge's pointed commentary criticizing the leanings of the company's technological culture (such as labeling Google+'s minimalist and, in his view, lackluster public platform "a pathetic afterthought") as well as for his comments about his former employer, Amazon (such as calling Amazon CEO Jeff Bezos "Dread Pirate Bezos"). Google co-founder Sergey Brin stated that he would still have his job. Washington Post reporter Melissa Bell stated that Yegge's public rant was a Jerry Maguire moment.

Software 
Yegge released the graphical MUD Wyvern in 2001 through his company Cabochon Inc.

Yegge advocates server-side JavaScript for development. After failing to convince Google to adopt Ruby on Rails, he ported Rails to JavaScript, creating the "Rhino on Rails" project. In 2008, Yegge was interviewed for the Google Code Blog and discussed the "Rhino on Rails" project. His work on "Rhino on Rails" has inspired at least one open-source clone, LatteJS.

Presentations 
In 2007, Yegge was a speaker at the UIUC 13th annual reflections❘projections Conference. In May 2008, Yegge presented a talk on dynamic languages at Stanford University. In July 2007, Yegge was a presenter at OSCON 2007, presenting a keynote speech on "How to Ignore Marketing and Become Irrelevant in Two Easy Steps".

Reputation 
Steve Yegge has been cited by many notable figures within the broader programming community, including Stuart Halloway who said: "And I am an enthusiast of Paul Graham and Steve Yegge and other folks that have evangelized Lisp to the rest of the developer community over the years." and Don Box who referred to one of Steve's blog posts from his own blog: "Had this just been another installment in the GNU-vs-XEmacs soap opera, there'd be nothing to see here. Sandwiched between this however are some observations that I think are relevant to anyone who writes programs (start reading from “the dubious future of emacs“). It's hard to argue with the value of self-hosting. It's even harder to argue with the momentum of the browser and dynamic environments."

References

External links 
 Steve Yegge's blog
 
 Steve Yegge's internal Amazon blog

Computer programmers
Living people
American male bloggers
American bloggers
MUD developers
Emacs
Year of birth missing (living people)